Alvin Dueck (born 1943) is an American psychologist and theologian, currently Distinguished Professor of Cultural Psychology at Fuller Theological Seminary.

References

Fuller Theological Seminary faculty
1943 births
University of Manitoba alumni
Appalachian State University alumni
Stanford University alumni
American theologians
Living people